Miroslav Štěpán (5 August 1945 – 23 March 2014) was a Czechoslovak politician. He was a member of the Communist Party of Czechoslovakia. He was the Secretary of the Municipal Party Committee in Prague and member of the Central Committee of the Communist Party of Czechoslovakia. He was born in Louny.

Štěpán died on 23 March 2014 from cancer in Prague, aged 68.

References

1945 births
2014 deaths
Deaths from cancer in the Czech Republic
Czech communists
Czechoslovak communists
Czechoslovak politicians